Richard Inwards (22 April 1840, Houghton Regis – 30 September 1937, London) was a mining engineer, astronomer and meteorologist.

Inwards managed the San Baldomero mine in Bolivia for Evans and Askin and then a mine in Spain for the Manganese Company. He reported on mines and mining projects in South America, Mexico, Norway, Austria, Spain, Portugal and England. He was a Fellow of the Royal Astronomical Society (elected 8 February 1861) and a Fellow of the Royal Meteorological Society (elected 19 March 1862). He served as president of the Royal Meteorological Society in 1894 and 1895.

Selected works
;

References

External links
 

1840 births
1937 deaths
19th-century British astronomers
English engineers
English meteorologists
Fellows of the Royal Astronomical Society
People from Central Bedfordshire District
Presidents of the Royal Meteorological Society